Soap bar or Soapbar may refer to:

 A bar of soap, surfactant used in conjunction with water for washing and cleaning
 A slang name for a form of low quality and adulterated hashish
 "Soap Bar", a song by Goldie Lookin Chain from their album Greatest Hits
 P-90 single coil electric guitar pickup